Hits of '89 Vol. 1 was a "hits" collection album featuring various artists released in Australia in 1989. The album spent 5 weeks at the top of the Australian album charts in 1989.

Track listing
"I'm Gonna Be (500 Miles)" - The Proclaimers
"Like the Way I Do" - Melissa Etheridge
"Especially for You" - Kylie Minogue & Jason Donovan
"Dont Walk Away" - Toni Childs
"Soul Revival" - Johnny Diesel and the Injectors
"Angel of Harlem" - U2
"Buffalo Stance" - Neneh Cherry
"Where Did I Go Wrong" - UB40
"Last Frontier" - Jimmy Barnes
"You Got It" - Roy Orbison
"Tucker's Daughter" - Ian Moss
"Dumb Things" - Paul Kelly & The Coloured Girls
"She Makes My Day" - Robert Palmer
"The Music Goes Round My Head" - The Saints
"Teardrops" - Womack & Womack
"Lets Stick Together" - Bryan Ferry
"Permanently Single" - The Cockroaches

Charts

References

1989 compilation albums
Pop compilation albums
EMI Records compilation albums